Chinese naturalized footballers are association football players originally from another country who changed their nationality to Chinese (People's Republic of China) via naturalization.

History 

Born in 1990 in Shanghai to a Tanzanian father and Chinese mother, Eddy Francis made one appearance for the China national under-14 football team in 2004. This was the first time a multiracial player has appeared for a Chinese national football team of any level.

Since 2019, China had begun a series of naturalization on foreign-based players in order to improve the China national team's fortunes, with the naturalization of Nico Yennaris, an English-born Cypriot and Chinese player. After the naturalization of Yennaris, China continued its naturalization process, with Tyias Browning, another English-born player with Chinese ancestry, being naturalized. Subsequently, Elkeson, a Brazilian player with no Chinese ancestry, was naturalized to become the 90th Brazilian who chose to represent another team outside Brazil.

List of naturalized footballers 

The following is a list of notable Chinese naturalized footballers. Footballers who have non-Chinese descent but likely had Chinese nationality at birth (e.g. Eddy Francis) or who are not notable, do not appear in the list.

If the player has previously participated in official matches on behalf of other national teams, he will still not be able to play for the Chinese national team after acquiring or restoring Chinese nationality. However, he can participate in Chinese football competitions as a domestic player.

See also
Naturalized athletes of China

Notes

References

 Naturalized
Naturalized
China naturalized
China
 Footballers
Naturalised association football players